Kernville may refer to:

Kernville, California
Kernville (former town), California
Kernville, Oregon
Kernville, Pennsylvania